Solana Valley (Spanish language Valle de la Solana; Aragonese language Val d'a Solana) is a valley in the Pyrenees. It is located in Aragon, Spain. River Ara cuts across the valley from east to west and its average altitude is 850 m.

History
There were many villages in Solana Valley. The inhabitants left the place between 1960 and 1970 owing to the pressure induced by ICONA, the Spanish National Institute for Forestal recovery that had bought the land surrounding the villages. There were other factors as well, such as the abandonment of traditional agricultural practices like sheep and goat rearing, as well as the lifestyle changes that swept over rural Spain after General Franco's Plan de Estabilización that pulled the local youth towards the cities and the coast.

Most of Solana Valley's territory depends administratively from Fiscal, Sobrarbe comarca, Huesca Province.

Ghost towns
In Solana Valley there are numerous village churches and smaller religious buildings, such as the Iglesia de la Asunción and the exconjuratory in Burgasé, the Iglesia de Santa María in Muro de Solana, Santiago Church in Villamana and Saint Peter's Church in Gere. Many of the churches are in ruins.

The villages in the valley lie abandoned and the houses have fallen into disrepair and ruin:

Burgasé
Càjol
Càmpol
Castellar
 Gere
Ginuabel
 Giral
Jánovas
Lacort
Lavelilla
Muro de Ara or Muro de Solana
Puyuelo
 Sasé
 Semolué
 San Martín de Puytarans or San Martín de la Solana
Sanfelices de Solana or Sanfelices de la Ribera
Villamana

See also
Exconjuratory

References

External links

Pirinei - La Solana
Picture of Janovas - Vallée de la Solana
Pictures of the villages

Valleys of Spain
Landforms of Aragon
Geography of the Province of Huesca
Ghost towns in Spain
Natural regions of Spain
Pyrenees